Edgar Miguel Ié (born 1 May 1994) is a professional footballer who plays primarily as a central defender but also as a right-back for Turkish club İstanbul Başakşehir.

After making one substitute appearance for Barcelona, he went on to play top-flight football in Portugal, France, Turkey and the Netherlands.

Ié represented Portugal at youth international level, including for the under-23 team at the 2016 Olympics, and earned one senior cap in 2017. He switched to Guinea-Bissau in 2021.

Club career

Barcelona
Born in Bissau, Guinea-Bissau, Ié joined Sporting CP's youth system in 2008, aged 14. In summer 2012, after concluding his development, he moved to FC Barcelona in Spain alongside teammate and compatriot Agostinho Cá.

In Catalonia, Ié started playing with the B team in the Segunda División. He made his official debut on 8 December 2012, playing ten minutes in a 1–1 home draw against Elche CF.

Ié made his first and only competitive appearance for Barcelona's main squad on 3 December 2014, replacing Jérémy Mathieu for the last 27 minutes of a 4–0 win at SD Huesca in the last 32 of the Copa del Rey. On 27 August 2015, he signed a three-year deal at Villarreal CF, being assigned to the reserves in Segunda División B. He appeared moderately often in a season which ended with a play-off berth, being sent off alongside Anton Shvets on 3 April in a 1–0 away victory over Valencia CF Mestalla.

Belenenses
On 26 December 2016, Ié returned to Lisbon, signing for C.F. Os Belenenses. He made his Primeira Liga debut the following 27 January, playing the full 90 minutes of a 1–0 away defeat of Boavista FC.

Lille
On 5 July 2017, Ié transferred to French club Lille OSC for €3 million, the highest transfer fee Belenenses ever received for a player. He scored his first goal in Ligue 1 on 28 January 2018, helping the hosts beat RC Strasbourg Alsace 2–1 by heading home a corner kick from Anwar El Ghazi in injury time.

Ié was loaned to FC Nantes also of the French top division in late January 2019.

Trabzonspor
On 12 August 2019, Ié signed a three-year contract with Trabzonspor of the Turkish Süper Lig as part of the deal involving Yusuf Yazıcı. He was loaned to Feyenoord four days later, making his Eredivisie debut on the 18th in a 1–1 home draw against FC Utrecht.

On 21 December 2021, Ié suffered a right knee anterior cruciate ligament injury in a 2–1 win at Altay SK, ruling him out for six months and therefore ending his season.

Later career
On 23 January 2023, Ié joined İstanbul Başakşehir F.K. on a deal until June 2024.

International career
Ié was initially selected by Portugal for the 2012 UEFA European Under-19 Championship, but missed the tournament in Estonia due to injury. Eventually, he won 37 caps at youth level, including 12 for the under-21 team. Coach Rui Jorge named him in the under-23 team that reached the quarter-finals of the 2016 Olympic tournament in Brazil.

Ié first appeared with the full side on 10 November 2017, coming on as a substitute for Pepe for the last 34 minutes of the 3–0 friendly win over Saudi Arabia in Viseu. In September 2021, however, he switched his allegiance to Guinea-Bissau, being selected on 5 November for 2022 FIFA World Cup qualifiers against Guinea and Sudan. He missed the 2021 Africa Cup of Nations through injury.

Personal life
Ié's twin brother, Edelino, is also a footballer. A midfielder, he too came through the youth teams at Sporting.

Club statistics

Honours
Barcelona
Copa del Rey: 2014–15

Trabzonspor
Turkish Super Cup: 2020

References

External links

1994 births
Living people
Bissau-Guinean emigrants to Portugal
Identical twins
Portuguese twins
Twin sportspeople
Portuguese sportspeople of Bissau-Guinean descent
Sportspeople from Bissau
Bissau-Guinean footballers
Portuguese footballers
Association football defenders
Primeira Liga players
Sporting CP footballers
C.F. Os Belenenses players
Segunda División players
Segunda División B players
FC Barcelona Atlètic players
FC Barcelona players
Villarreal CF B players
Ligue 1 players
Lille OSC players
FC Nantes players
Süper Lig players
Trabzonspor footballers
İstanbul Başakşehir F.K. players
Eredivisie players
Feyenoord players
Portugal youth international footballers
Portugal under-21 international footballers
Portugal international footballers
Footballers at the 2016 Summer Olympics
Olympic footballers of Portugal
Bissau-Guinean expatriate footballers
Portuguese expatriate footballers
Expatriate footballers in Spain
Expatriate footballers in France
Expatriate footballers in Turkey
Expatriate footballers in the Netherlands
Portuguese expatriate sportspeople in Spain
Portuguese expatriate sportspeople in France
Portuguese expatriate sportspeople in Turkey
Portuguese expatriate sportspeople in the Netherlands
Bissau-Guinean expatriate sportspeople in Spain
Bissau-Guinean expatriate sportspeople in France
Bissau-Guinean expatriate sportspeople in Turkey